In motorsport, a satellite team is a team related to a larger, better-funded team. This relation may involve ownership, technical support and staff sharing, including drivers. Current examples include NASCAR outfit Wood Brothers Racing, which is currently related to Team Penske, Leavine Family Racing, which acts as a satellite team to Joe Gibbs Racing, and Formula One teams Scuderia AlphaTauri (supported by Red Bull Racing), Haas F1 Team (supported by Scuderia Ferrari) and Aston Martin Cognizant F1 Team (supported by Mercedes-AMG Petronas Motorsport).

If the larger team is factory-backed (i.e. supported by a manufacturer), then the satellite team is termed a semi-works team. As of 2010, several World Rally Championship teams are semi-works: the Citroën Junior Team is linked to the Citroën World Rally Team, whereas Stobart and Munchi's are supported by the Ford World Rally Team. In MotoGP, factory teams are given the most up-to-date motorcycles and parts, while satellite teams may use the previous season's motorcycle and are given equipment updates only after the factory team has had them.

However, also in MotoGP, certain satellite teams like Pramac Ducati and LCR Honda do have access to up-to-date factory bikes starting from 2017. In 2019, Petronas Yamaha SRT and Red Bull KTM Tech 3 do have access to up-to-date factory bike. In 2020, the Pramac Ducati & Red Bull KTM Tech 3 riders are given the up-to-date factory bike, unlike those for the LCR Honda and Petronas Yamaha SRT - which is only given for one rider. In 2021, the LCR Honda will receive the two factory-specification Honda RC213V's bikes - for the first time - for both riders.

Starting 2016, satellite teams may be given a trophy as well if their riders are leading the Independent category.

Also in MotoGP, it is rare that the satellite riders can be a MotoGP World Champion since they always have a one-year old bike, although some of them rode with an up-to-date factory bike. The satellite riders who clinched the premier class world title are Kenny Roberts, Marco Lucchinelli, Franco Uncini, Eddie Lawson, and Valentino Rossi.

References 

Motorsport terminology